WW domain-binding protein 2 is a protein that in humans is encoded by the WBP2 gene.

The globular WW domain is composed of 38 to 40 semiconserved amino acids shared by proteins of diverse functions including structural, regulatory, and signaling proteins. The domain is involved in mediating protein-protein interactions through the binding of polyproline ligands. This gene encodes a WW domain binding protein, which binds to the WW domain of Yes kinase-associated protein by its PY motifs. The function of this protein has not been determined.

Model organisms

Model organisms have been used in the study of WBP2 function. A conditional knockout mouse line, called Wbp2tm1a(EUCOMM)Wtsi was generated as part of the International Knockout Mouse Consortium program — a high-throughput mutagenesis project to generate and distribute animal models of disease to interested scientists.

Male and female animals underwent a standardized phenotypic screen to determine the effects of deletion. Twenty three tests were carried out on mutant mice and two significant abnormalities were observed. Homozygous mutant animals displayed an abnormal brainstem auditory evoked potential, while females also had decreased circulating amylase levels.

References

Further reading

Genes mutated in mice